Cryptotriton monzoni is a species of salamander in the family Plethodontidae. It is endemic to Guatemala and known only from near its type locality, Cerro del Mono near La Unión, Zacapa Department. The specific name monzoni honors José Monzón, a Guatemalan entomologist who helped the authors with the fieldwork. Common name Monzon's hidden salamander has been coined for it.

Description
The snout is broadly rounded and the eyes are protuberant. The head is just slightly wider than the neck. The parotoid glands are weakly developed. The limbs are relatively long. Both the fingers and the toes are about moderately extensively webbed and have sub-digital pads. The dorsum is brown and has bluish flecks. The iris is copper.

Habitat and conservation
The holotype was found in a bromeliad about three metres above the forest floor.

Cryptotriton monzoni is apparently a rare species. Its threatened by habitat loss caused by logging and agricultural encroachment. Chytridiomycosis might also be a threat (a specimen of Bolitoglossa conanti was infected at the type locality).

References

monzoni
Critically endangered fauna of North America
Endemic fauna of Guatemala
Amphibians of Guatemala
Taxa named by Jonathan A. Campbell
Amphibians described in 1998
Taxonomy articles created by Polbot